Enrique Cánovas Lacruz (A Coruña, 29 June 1877 – Madrid, 13 October 1965) was a Spanish military officer, captain general of Valencia and Director General of the Civil Guard during the early years of the Francoist regime.

Biography 
Born in A Coruña on 29 June 1877, his parents were Pascual Cánovas Carrillo, captain of the Infantry, and his mother Práxedes Lacruz Tordesillas. Shortly after, the family moved to Vigo, where he spend his childhood and managed to excel in his studies. On August 24, 1892, when he was barely 15 years old, he entered the General Military Academy of Toledo.

After his return from Cuba, he married Concepción Curbera Vicuña, daughter of local businessman Enrique Curbera Tapias, on 23 September 1910. His wife passed away on 4 November 1933. Two years later, in 1935, he entered the Generalate Promotion Course.

Graduated from the Academy of Military Engineering of Guadalajara, after passing through the General Military Academy of Toledo, at the time of the coup d'état on 18 July 1936, he held the rank of colonel and was chief of the Service of Engineers of the VIII Military Region. He joined the Nationalist faction and was in charge of making the coup succeed in Vigo.

On 7 October 1940, he replaced Lieutenant General Antonio Aranda as Captain General of the III Military Region. During his tenure, he softened the situation of the special courts, allowing defenders to provide all kinds of evidence. On 13 April 1942, he was appointed Director General of the Civil Guard, a position he held until 1 July 1943, when he moved to the reserve. During his tenure, the internal regulations and official uniforms were approved.

Awards 
 Grand Cross (with White Decoration) of Military Merit (1941)
 Grand Cross of the Order of Cisneros (1965)

References 

1877 births
1965 deaths
People from Galicia (Spain)
People from A Coruña
20th-century Spanish military personnel
Spanish captain generals
Spanish military personnel of the Rif War
Spanish military personnel of the Spanish Civil War (National faction)
Civil Guard (Spain)
Grand Crosses of Military Merit